Bang Chan is a khwaeng (subdistrict) of Khlong Sam Wa district, in Bangkok, Thailand. In 2020, it had a total population of 88,936 people.

References

Subdistricts of Bangkok
Khlong Sam Wa district